The Upright Citizens Brigade (UCB) is an improvisational and sketch comedy group that emerged from Chicago's ImprovOlympic in 1990. The original incarnation of the group consisted of Matt Besser, Amy Poehler,  Ian Roberts, Matt Walsh, Adam McKay, Rick Roman, Horatio Sanz and Drew Franklin. Other early members included Neil Flynn, Armando Diaz, Ali Farahnakian and Rich Fulcher.

In 2013, Besser, Roberts and Walsh wrote The Upright Citizens Brigade Comedy Improvisation Manual.

History

The Upright Citizens Brigade began performing improv and sketch comedy at Kill the Poet in Chicago. Their first show was called Virtual Reality. The group followed with shows titled UCBTV, Conference on the Future of Happiness, Thunderball, Bucket of Truth, Big Dirty Hands, The Real Real World, and Punch Your Friend in the Face.

In 1993, the Upright Citizens Brigade (Matt Besser, Ian Roberts, Amy Poehler, Adam McKay, Rick Roman, and Horatio Sanz) were regular guests on stage at the New Variety produced and hosted by Richard O'Donnell at the Chicago Improv comedy club, 504 N. Wells.

In 1996, the Upright Citizens Brigade relocated to New York and began performing shows and offering improv training at Solo Arts Group. These shows and classes were so popular that the UCB were able to open their own theater, The Upright Citizens Brigade Theatre, at 161 W. 22nd Street in Chelsea on February 4, 1999, in a former nude dance club. On April 1, 2003, they moved to a new space at 307 W. 26th Street. On November 30, 2017, they moved again to 555 West 42nd Street in Hell's Kitchen. In July 2005, the UCB opened at the Tamarind Theatre in Los Angeles at 5919 Franklin Avenue (between Tamarind & North Bronson Avenue). In 2011, UCB opened a second New York City theater and bar space in the East Village, UCB East, which ran smaller-scale shows for $10 or less. The UCB East permanently closed on February 9, 2019. In its stead, the group once (but no longer) offered three nights of programming per week in the nearby SubCulture theatre on Bleecker Street. The Upright Citizens Brigade has performed in the Comedy Tent at the Bonnaroo Music and Arts Festival in Manchester, Tennessee.

Screen ventures
The original group, Matt Besser, Matt Walsh, Ian Roberts, and Amy Poehler have had two TV shows—Upright Citizens Brigade and The UCB Show—and their show ASSSSCAT has been televised twice. In addition to this they had a TV movie called Escape From It's a Wonderful Life and appeared weekly on Late Night with Conan O'Brien in the 90s.

In the way of film, in 2002 they created and starred in the film Martin & Orloff, and made another movie in 2007 titled Wild Girls Gone. Neither film was particularly successful or well received.

The group has participated in web series including the ongoing series UCB Comedy Originals, created in 2008, which occasionally shows sketches, and I Hate Being Single, created in 2012.

In 2016, Universal Cable Productions announced signing Upright Citizens Brigade to a first-look production deal.

Notable alumni
Since its inception in the 1990s, UCB has produced numerous notable comedians.

The Chris Gethard Show with Chris Gethard and Broad City with Ilana Glazer and Abbi Jacobson are examples of successful TV shows that started as UCB experiments.

Saturday Night Live has been known for seeking top talent in improv theatre.

Other famous alumni of the training company include comedians Adam Conover, Paul Scheer, Rob Huebel, Seth Morris, Aubrey Plaza, Zach Woods, Ellie Kemper, Sasheer Zamata,  Nicole Byer, Andrew Daly, Jason Mantzoukas, Nick Kroll, D'Arcy Carden, Jordan Klepper, Milana Vayntrub,Kyle Mooney, and Ben Schwartz, as well as actors Abbi Jacobson, Ilana Glazer, and Kelly Marie Tran, writer-director Kay Cannon, and internet personalities Ninja Sex Party, Brennan Lee Mulligan, Emily Axford, and Donald Glover.

See also
 The Second City
 The Groundlings
 ImprovOlympic
 Under the Gun Theater

References

Further reading

External links

 

American comedy troupes
Improvisational troupes
Performance art in New York City
Comedy collectives